The 2021 Arkansas State Red Wolves baseball team represented Arkansas State University during the 2021 NCAA Division I baseball season. The Red Wolves played their home games at Tomlinson Stadium–Kell Field and were led by thirteenth–year head coach Tommy Raffo. They were members of the Sun Belt Conference.

Preseason

Signing Day Recruits

Sun Belt Conference Coaches Poll
The Sun Belt Conference Coaches Poll was released on February 15, 2021 and the Red Wolves were picked to finish sixth in the West Division with 13 votes.

Preseason All-Sun Belt Team & Honors
Aaron Funk (LR, Pitcher)
Jordan Jackson (GASO, Pitcher)
Conor Angel (LA, Pitcher)
Wyatt Divis (UTA, Pitcher)
Lance Johnson (TROY, Pitcher)
Caleb Bartolero (TROY, Catcher)
William Sullivan (TROY, 1st Base)
Luke Drumheller (APP, 2nd Base)
Drew Frederic (TROY, Shortstop)
Cooper Weiss (CCU, 3rd Base)
Ethan Wilson (USA, Outfielder)
Parker Chavers (CCU, Outfielder)
Rigsby Mosley (TROY, Outfielder)
Eilan Merejo (GSU, Designated Hitter)
Andrew Beesly (ULM, Utility)

Roster
{| class="toccolours" style="text-align: left; font-size:90%;"
|-
! colspan="9" style="; text-align:center;"| 2021 Arkansas State Red Wolves roster
|-
|width="03"| 
|valign="top"|
Pitchers
13 Walker Williams - Freshman
16 Brandon Anderson - Senior
17 Jared Wilson - Senior
18 Will Nash - Senior
20 Carter Holt - Junior
21 Jack Jumper - Senior
23 Will Gross - Freshman
24 Max Charlton - Freshman
25 Phillip Bryant - Redshirt Sophomore
27 Kollin Stone - Senior
28 Josh Albat - Sophomore
29 Max Gehler - Senior
30 Tyler Jeans - Freshman
31 Jaden Woolbright - Freshman
33 Brandon Hudson - Freshman
35 Andrew McGlynn - Junior
36 Zech Jarrard - Senior
37 Will Gilmer - Junior
39 Jake Algee - Sophomore
40 Tristan Camp - Sophomore
41 Bryce Bartlett - ''Senior|width="15"| 
|valign="top"|Catchers8 Parker Rowland - Sophomore
11 Brandon Hager - Freshman
19 John Hoskyn - SophomoreInfielders3 Garrett Olson - Sophomore
4 Jared Toler - Freshman
6 Blake McCutchen - Senior
9 Ben Klutts - Senior
10 Jacob Hager - Freshman
15 Liam Hicks - Senior
26 Jake Gish - Sophomore
32 Sky-lar Culver - Senior
38 Will Huber - JuniorOutfielders1 Eli Davis - Junior
2 Drew Tipton - Senior
5 Tyler Duncan - Senior
7 Andrew Leggo - Senior
12 Brandon Ulmer - Sophomore
14 Sam Fagan - Freshman
34 Jaylon Deshazier - Senior

|}

Coaching staff

Schedule and resultsSchedule Source:*Rankings are based on the team's current ranking in the D1Baseball poll.

Posteason
Conference Accolades 
Player of the Year: Mason McWhorter – GASO
Pitcher of the Year: Hayden Arnold – LR
Freshman of the Year: Garrett Gainous – TROY
Newcomer of the Year: Drake Osborn – LA
Coach of the Year: Mark Calvi – USAAll Conference First TeamConnor Cooke (LA)
Hayden Arnold (LR)
Carlos Tavera (UTA)
Nick Jones (GASO)
Drake Osborn (LA)
Robbie Young (APP)
Luke Drumheller (APP)
Drew Frederic (TROY)Ben Klutts (ARST)Mason McWhorter (GASO)
Logan Cerny (TROY)
Ethan Wilson (USA)
Cameron Jones (GSU)
Ben Fitzgerald (LA)All Conference Second TeamJoJo Booker (USA)
Tyler Tuthill (APP)
Jeremy Lee (USA)
Aaron Barkley (LR)
BT Riopelle (CCU)
Dylan Paul (UTA)
Travis Washburn (ULM)
Eric Brown (CCU)
Grant Schulz (ULM)Tyler Duncan (ARST)Parker Chavers (CCU)
Josh Smith (GSU)
Andrew Miller (UTA)
Noah Ledford (GASO)References:'''

References

Arkansas State
Arkansas State Red Wolves baseball seasons
Arkansas State Red Wolves baseball